Camp de Mar is  a small resort village in the municipality of Andratx on the Spanish Balearic Island of Mallorca. The resort's beach has been awarded a blue flag.

Description 
The resort is in a sheltered bay which is enclosed by high cliffs. There is a small sandy beach with a profusion of rocks, making it an ideal place for snorkeling. Just off the shore there is a small island, which can be reached by bridge, on which there is a popular restaurant.

Activities 
In the countryside surrounding the resort there are six championship golf courses. The course nearest to the resort is the 18-hole Golf de Andratx, next door to the Steigenberger Golf & Spa Resort Camp de Mar

References

Beaches of Mallorca
Populated places in Mallorca
Beaches of the Balearic Islands